WAOR (102.7 FM, "Froggy 102.7") is a hot adult contemporary formatted radio station serving listeners in northern Indiana and southwestern lower Michigan, in the United States. It is owned by Federated Media, and operated with 2,000 watts.  The station's transmitter is located in Ligonier, Indiana, and its studios are located in the Federated Media Mediaplex in downtown Elkhart, Indiana.

History
After a stint as Cow Country, Froggy 102.7 went on the air in 2002 with a Hybrid AC format. The station played standard Hot AC artists, but also marketed itself as having the most variety; a typical hour's playlist would include several current pop hits, as well as disco, country, classic R & B, and classic rock.

The station was known for its involvement with the local community; the airstaff averaged nearly 200 personal appearances a year, and did a considerable amount of community-oriented charity work.  The station's signature event was a Polar Plunge promotion called The Leprechaun Leap, which raised money for United Cancer Services of Elkhart County.

After a successful 10-year run as a Froggy-branded station, WLEG segued to a sports talk format branded as 102.7 The Fan on Monday, June 4, 2012, at 9:00 AM EST as part of a series of music-to-sports format changes that occurred across Indiana that day. The last song on Froggy 102.7 was "Part of Me" by Katy Perry (which was cut off about halfway through by the introductory montage for The Fan.) 102.7 The Fan features numerous syndicated programs from the Fox Sports Radio network, including The Dan Patrick Show.

On April 1, 2014, WLEG became an ESPN Radio affiliate. This change added shows Mike & Mike, The Herd with Colin Cowherd, SVP & Russillo Dan LeBatard, Sedano and Stink, and Freddie Coleman on weekdays, and various weekend programming on ESPN. On August 14, 2014, WLEG changed their call letters to WAOR.

On August 28, 2017, at 6 am, WAOR changed their format from sports to hot adult contemporary, returning to the "Froggy 102.7" branding.

Previous logo

References

External links
Official website

AOR
Elkhart, Indiana
Radio stations established in 1992
1992 establishments in Indiana
Hot adult contemporary radio stations in the United States